This is a list of people from Aachen, alternatively known as Bad Aachen and Aix-la-Chapelle, arranged by date.

Pre 13th century

 Charlemagne (748–814), also known as Charles the Great, moved to Aachen and made it the capital of his empire
 Æthelwulf (–858), king of Wessex, and father of Alfred the Great, was born in Aachen

13th–17th century 

 Theobald Craschel (1511–1587), auxiliary bishop in Cologne

18th century 
 Isabelle Brunelle (1724–1805), refugee and philanthropist
 Johann Joseph Couven (1701–1763), architect and builder

1800–1820 

 Adam Eberle (1804–1832), history painter and lithographer of the romance
 Friedrich Thyssen (1804–1877), banker
 Johannes Theodor Laurent (1804–1884), Apostolic Vicar of Luxemburg
 Alfred von Reumont (1808–1887), statesman and historian
 Henri Victor Regnault (1810–1878), French physicist and chemist
 Arnold Foerster (1810–1884), botanist and entomologist
 Peter Ludwig Kuhnen (1812–1877), landscape painter of the Romantic
 Mary Frances Schervier (1819–1876), founder of the  Poor Sisters of St. Francis

1821–1840 

 Joseph Hubert Reinkens (1821–1896), Old Catholic Church bishop and theologian
 Franz Bock (1823–1899), canon and art historian
 Adolph von Hansemann (1826–1903), entrepreneur and banker
 Adolph Sutro (1830–1898), mayor of San Francisco
 Adam Bock (1832–1912), politician
 Albert Baur (1835–1906), German painter
 Anton Anno (1838–1893), German theatre actor, theatre director, and playwright

1841–1860 

 Ludwig von Pastor (1854–1928), historian and Austrian diplomat

1861–1880 

 Arthur Kampf (1864–1950), history painter and university professor
 Arthur Eichengrün (1867–1949), chemist and university lecturer
 Friedrich Pützer (1871–1922), architect, Protestant church architect and university lecturer
 Gottfried Hinze (1873–1953), 1st Chairman of the German Football Association
 Heinrich Hubert Houben (1875–1935), literary critic and journalist

1881–1900 
 Ilse Essers (1898–1994), aeronautical engineer
 Wilhelm Worringer (1881–1965), art historian
 Hugo Werner-Kahle (1882–1961), actor
 Hanns Bolz (1885–1918), painter, sculptor and illustrator
 Emil Fahrenkamp (1885–1966), architect, university professor and director of Düsseldorf Art Academy
 Ludwig Mies van der Rohe (1886–1969), architect
 Adam Kuckhoff (1887–1943), writer and resistance fighter against Nazism
 Walter Grotrian (1890–1954), astronomer and astrophysicist
 Walter Hasenclever (1890–1940), writer
 Hans Freiherr von Funck (1891–1979), an officer
 Edgar André (1894–1936), politician
 Alfred Gottschalk (1894–1973), biochemist
 Heinrich Maria Davringhausen (1894–1970), painter
 Hans Croon (1896–1977), a textile manufacturer and president of the IHK Aachen
 Edith Frank (1900–1945), mother to Anne Frank, was born in Aachen

1901–1910 

 Robert Ritter (1901–1951), Nazi racial theorist
 Leonhard Drach (1903–1996), jurist and war criminal
 Carl Schneider (1905–1975), painter and university professor
 Helmuth Gericke (1909–2007), mathematician and historian of mathematics
 Hans Ernst Schneider alias Hans Schwerte (1909/10–1999), SS-Hauptsturmführer and literary scholar

1911–1920 

 Friedrich Hendrix (1911–1941), athlete
 Bert Heller (1912–1970), painter
 Fredy Hirsch (1916–1944) German Jewish youth movement leader known for helping children during the Holocaust 
 Karl Otto Götz (b. 1914), the main representative of abstract art and Informel in Germany

1921–1930 

 Claus Helmut Drese (1922–2011), opera and theatre director, writer
 Max Imdahl (1925–1988), art historian
 Otto Graf Lambsdorff (1926–2009), politician (FDP)

1931–1940 
 Heiner Ruland (1934–2017), composer and music therapist
 Gerd Heinz (born 1940), stage, film and television actor, stage director and theatre manager
 Horst H. Baumann (born 1934), artist, designer and photographer
 Kurt Malangré (1934–2018), politician
 Paul Theissen (born 1937), pianist, conductor and choirmaster
 Wolf Kahlen (born 1940), video pioneer and performance, object and media artist

1941–1950 

 Manfred Schell (born 1943), trade unionist and politician
 Raymund Havenith (1947–1993), pianist and university lecturer
 Paul Lovens (born 1949), drummer
 Ulla Schmidt (born 1949), politician
 Franz Josef Radermacher (born 1950), professor of computer science

1951–1960 

 Udo Dahmen (born 1951), drummer, managing director of the Pop Academy Baden-Württemberg and music lecturer
 Léo Apotheker (born 1953), manager, SAP
 Matthias Frings (born 1953), journalist, television presenter and writer
 Karl Del'Haye (born 1955), football player
 Bascha Mika (born 1954) is a German journalist and publicist
 Isabel Pfeiffer-Poensgen (born 1954), politician
 Thomas Springel (born 1959), handball player
 Sabine Wils (born 1959), politician

1960-2000
 Sabina Classen (born 1963), thrash metal singer of the band Holy Moses, was born in Aachen
 Michael Reisch (born 1964), artist and photographer, was born in Aachen
 Uli Kusch (born 1967), a worldwide recognized metal drummer, was born in Aachen
 Kool Savas (born 1975), musician and rapper
 David Garrett (born 1980), a world-famous violinist, was born in Aachen.
 Katrin Heß (born 1985), actress and model
Kai Havertz (born 1999), German professional footballer

References

 
Aachen
History of Aachen
People